The Wavelet Tree is a succinct data structure to store strings in compressed space.

Originally introduced to represent compressed suffix arrays, it has found application in several contexts. The tree is defined by recursively partitioning the alphabet into pairs of subsets; the leaves correspond to individual symbols of the alphabet, and at each node a bitvector stores whether a symbol of the string belongs to one subset or the other.

The name derives from an analogy with the wavelet transform for signals, which recursively decomposes a signal into low-frequency and high-frequency components.

Properties 

Access operation 

A wavelet tree contains a bitmap representation of a string. If we know the alphabet set, then the exact string can be inferred by tracking bits down the tree. To find the letter at ith position in the string :- 

   Input:
     - The position i in the string of which we want to know the letter, starting at 1.
     - The top node W of the wavelet tree that represents the string
   Output: The letter at position i

     if W.isLeafNode return W.letter
     if W.bitvector[i] = 0 return access(i - rank(W.bitvector, i), W.left)
     else return access(rank(W.bitvector, i), W.right)

Because the rank can be calculated in O(1) by using succinct dictionaries, any S[i] in string S can be accessed in   time, as long as the tree is balanced.

Extensions 
Several extensions to the basic structure have been presented in the literature. To reduce the height of the tree, multiary nodes can be used instead of binary. The data structure can be made dynamic, supporting insertions and deletions at arbitrary points of the string; this feature enables the implementation of dynamic FM-indexes. This can be further generalized, allowing the update operations to change the underlying alphabet: the Wavelet Trie exploits the trie structure on an alphabet of strings to enable dynamic tree modifications.

Further reading 
 Wavelet Trees. A blog post describing the construction of a wavelet tree, with examples.

The wavelet Tree has many applications in different domains such as geographical search. Researchers presented a dual indexing technique based on a wavelet tree for Geographical Information Retrieval (GIR). The large amount of geographical information on the internet has made the indexing challenging during the information retrieval which is defined as an activity to retrieve a set of information based on our need from a set of resources. An efficient indexing technique is an essential requirement in processing of the plenty of data that are present in today’s information retrieval systems. This has been the motivation towards the design and development of several different indexing structures with a primary focus towards secondary memory as compared to the main memory which used to consist of a smaller size as well as a higher cost in the beginning, however with a dramatic reduction in the main memory prices, indexes in the main memory has also been introduced which led to the development of primary memory-based indexing structures.

Dual indexing technique uses wavelet tree data structure for both textual and spatial indexing and allows for the use of MBR in dynamic insertion during index construction. It has the advantage of supporting parallel computing when there is an extensive data set involved. It can be used extensively and concurrently on different machines such that textual data can be searched on one machine and spatial data on another machine which in turn results in the reduction of the search time and the storage space, hence making this method way more efficient as compared to the previous proposed methods. Experimental results support this by showing that when pure spatial indexing is used, search time complexity is reduced and takes even less than one third time of that of spatial indexing performed using previously introduced methods namely R-tree or R*-tree. In addition, the search time is decreased by half in the case of dual indexing (textual and spatial) using wavelet tree, as compared to the other techniques like B/R, B/R* when the search query length is larger than 2 keywords.

References

External links

Trees (data structures)
Succinct data structure
String data structures